Pere d'Abella was a 15th-century Catalan poet. He is the author of Pus aix-t plau ta bandera estendre (It pleases your flag to fly), in which he expresses the conventions of troubadour love.

References

Year of birth unknown
Year of death unknown
15th-century writers
Poets from Catalonia